Cristina Matiquite (born 12 March 1992) is an Angolan basketball player.. She competed for Angola at the 2011 FIBA Africa Championship. She plays as a Center.

References

External links
 2011 FIBA Africa Championship Profile

Angolan women's basketball players
C.D. Maculusso basketball players
C.D. Primeiro de Agosto women's basketball players
G.D. Interclube women's basketball players
1992 births
Living people
Centers (basketball)
African Games silver medalists for Angola
African Games medalists in basketball
Competitors at the 2011 All-Africa Games